Mary Dunn may refer to:

Marie Prevost (1896–1937), Canadian-American actress born Mary Bickford Dunn
Mary Dunn (author) (1900–1958), British author who created Lady Blanche Addle
Mary Dunn (yoga) (1942–2008), American Iyengar yoga instructor
Mary Maples Dunn (1931–2017), American historian
Mary Dunn (sports executive) (1903–1965), Canadian sports executive